is a Japanese boxer. He competed in the men's light middleweight event at the 1964 Summer Olympics. At the 1964 Summer Olympics, he defeated Jannie Gibson of Rhodesia in the Round of 32 before losing to Joseph Gonzales of France in the Round of 16.

References

1944 births
Living people
Japanese male boxers
Olympic boxers of Japan
Boxers at the 1964 Summer Olympics
Place of birth missing (living people)
Asian Games medalists in boxing
Boxers at the 1962 Asian Games
Asian Games gold medalists for Japan
Medalists at the 1962 Asian Games
Light-middleweight boxers